Miranda (formerly Jacobsen's) is a census-designated place in Humboldt County, California. The ZIP Code is 95553. The population was 520 at the 2010 census.

The name Miranda was originally applied to the area's post office on August 26, 1905. One account states that it is not known whether the name giver had in mind a girl or the well-known Spanish place name and family name. Miranda was known as Jacobsen's Valley until the post office was established. Another account states that Etta Coombs chose the name "Miranda" for the post office she started. Miranda is located on the Avenue of the Giants between Myers Flat to the north and Phillipsville to the south.

South Fork High School is the only regular high school of Southern Humboldt Unified School District, and currently boasts around 150 students from all of southern Humboldt County. The school's name refers to the South Fork of the Eel River. Osprey Learning Center, an alternative continuation high school, is located across the football field from SFHS in facilities that formerly housed Miranda Junior High School. Today, Miranda Junior High School now stands where the former tennis court was, as construction was completed in 2014.

The ZIP Code is 95553. The community is inside area code 707. Miranda is in the Pacific Standard Time zone and observes daylight saving time.

Demographics

2010
The 2010 United States Census reported that Miranda had a population of 520. The racial makeup of Miranda was 439 (84.4%) White, 4 (0.8%) African American, 13 (2.5%) Native American, 4 (0.8%) Asian, 1 (0.2%) Pacific Islander, 31 (6.0%) from other races, and 28 (5.4%) from two or more races. Hispanic or Latino of any race were 75 persons (14.4%).

The Census reported that 512 people (98.5% of the population) lived in households, 8 (1.5%) lived in non-institutionalized group quarters, and 0 (0%) were institutionalized.

There were 243 households, out of which 74 (30.5%) had children under the age of 18 living in them, 88 (36.2%) were opposite-sex married couples living together, 30 (12.3%) had a female householder with no husband present, 20 (8.2%) had a male householder with no wife present.  There were 22 (9.1%) unmarried opposite-sex partnerships, and 1 (0.4%) same-sex married couples or partnerships. 92 households (37.9%) were made up of individuals, and 19 (7.8%) had someone living alone who was 65 years of age or older. The average household size was 2.11.  There were 138 families (56.8% of all households); the average family size was 2.72.

The population was spread out, with 117 people (22.5%) under the age of 18, 31 people (6.0%) aged 18 to 24, 127 people (24.4%) aged 25 to 44, 185 people (35.6%) aged 45 to 64, and 60 people (11.5%) who were 65 years of age or older.  The median age was 41.3 years. For every 100 females, there were 94.0 males.  For every 100 females age 18 and over, there were 89.2 males.

The homeowner vacancy rate was 0.7%; the rental vacancy rate was 0%.  291 people (56.0% of the population) lived in owner-occupied housing units and 221 people (42.5%) lived in rental housing units.

2000
According to the U.S. Census Bureau, at about the year 2000, Miranda's total population was approximately 857. This figure, however, encompasses a much larger geographic area than Miranda proper. The official town population listed on the Miranda welcome sign is significantly lower. Only 5.6% were under 5 years of age, while 75.4% were over 18 and 8.3% over 65. A marginally high 14.7% of those over 18 were civilian veterans. Of those over age 5, 24.6% were of disability status. Majorly of one race (97.3%), Miranda is home to 91.8% White (unspecified origin), 0.5% African American or Black, 2.9% American Indian or Alaskan Native, 0.6% Asian, 0.1% Native Hawaiian or Other Pacific Islander, 1.4% of some other race, and 4.6% Hispanic or Latino. Median household income was $17,422, while median family income was slightly higher at $21,146. Nearly one third (29.4%) of the population as individuals were below the poverty line. Total occupied housing units were 391 out of 505 total units, leaving 114 vacancies. Median value of single-owner occupied homes was $114,400.

Politics

See also

References

External links
South Fork High School
Miranda Travel & Resource Guide

Census-designated places in Humboldt County, California
Populated places established in 1905
Census-designated places in California
1905 establishments in California